Visual Paradigm (VP-UML) is a UML CASE Tool supporting UML 2, SysML and Business Process Modeling Notation (BPMN) from the Object Management Group (OMG). In addition to the modeling support, it provides report generation and code engineering capabilities including code generation. It can reverse engineer diagrams from code, and provide round-trip engineering for various programming languages.

Product Editions
Higher-priced editions provide more features.

The following editions were available in November 2010:
Community Edition
A free edition for non-commercial use. Supports all 14 UML diagram types. 
For non-commercial use only.
Modeler Edition
Standard Edition
Professional Edition
Enterprise Edition
Supports BPMN 2.0 for modeling of business processes.

UML Modeling
Visual Paradigm supports 14 types of diagrams:
 Class diagram
 Use case diagram
 Sequence diagram
 Communication diagram
 State machine diagram
 Activity diagram
 Component diagram
 Deployment diagram
 Package diagram
 Object diagram
 Composite structure diagram
 Profile diagram
 Timing diagram
 Interaction overview diagram

Requirements Management
Visual Paradigm supports requirements management including user stories, use cases, SysML requirement diagrams and textual analysis.

A SysML requirement diagram specifies the capability or condition that must be delivered in the target system. Capability refers to the functions that the system must support. Condition means that the system should be able to run or produce the result given a specific constraint. Visual Paradigm provides a SysML requirement diagram for specifying and analyzing requirements.

Business Process Modeling
Supports BPMN 2.0 for modeling of business processes.
The latest version (Aug 2016) also supports Case Management with CMMN.

Data Modeling
Visual Paradigm supports both Entity Relationship Diagrams (ERD) and Object Relational Mapping Diagrams (ORMD). ERD is used to model the relational database. ORMD is one of the tools to show the mapping between class from object-oriented world and entity in relational database world.

References

External links
 Visual Paradigm for UML Product Home

Information science
UML tools